Alindao Airport  is an airstrip serving Alindao, a town in the Basse-Kotto prefecture of the Central African Republic.

See also

Transport in the Central African Republic
List of airports in the Central African Republic

References

External links 
OurAirports - Alindao Airport
FallingRain - Alindao

Airports in the Central African Republic
Buildings and structures in Basse-Kotto